Red lipstick is a popular kind of lipstick. The term may also refer to:

 "Red Lipstick", a song by Rihanna from Talk That Talk
 "Red Lipstick", a song by Nomo, a band that included David Batteau
 "Red Lipstick", a song by Trey Songz from Passion, Pain & Pleasure
 "Red Lipstick", a song by Skint & Demoralised from Love and Other Catastrophes
 Red Lipstick, a 2000 independent film

See also 
 Lipstick (disambiguation)